Avis Wyatt (born August 20, 1984) is an American retired basketball player. After four years playing in college for Virginia State, Wyatt played in the Netherlands, Cyprus and Greece.

Biography 
Avis is a native of Petersburg, Virginia. He attended Petersburg High School as well as Virginia State University. While attending Virginia State University, Avis pledged Phi Beta Sigma fraternity, Fall 2004.

Career
Wyatt started his professional career in 2007, in the Netherlands with MyGuide Amsterdam. Here he played for two seasons and won the DBL championship two times. The next year, Wyatt moved to Cyprus to play for AEL Limassol, reaching the finals of the Cypriot League. 

On June 17, 2011, Wyatt signed with GasTerra Flames to return to the Netherlands. In his year with Flames, Wyatt averaged 8.7 points and 6 rebounds per game. The team reached the semi-finals of the 2011–12 DBL season.

Honours
MyGuide Amsterdam
2x Dutch Champion (2): 2008, 2009
AEL Limassol
All-League First Team (1): 2011
GasTerra Flames
DBL blocks leader (1): 2012

References

1984 births
Living people
American expatriate basketball people in the Netherlands
American men's basketball players
Amsterdam Basketball players
Basketball players from Virginia
Centers (basketball)
Donar (basketball club) players
Dutch Basketball League players
Power forwards (basketball)
Sportspeople from Petersburg, Virginia
Virginia State Trojans men's basketball players